Shindan Castle is a historical castle located in Border of the Republic of Azerbaijan and Iran, The longevity of this fortress dates back to the Before the advent of Islam.

References 

Castles in Iran
Castles and fortresses in Azerbaijan